Sara Cecilia Kjellker (born 7 September 1998) is a Swedish professional golfer and Ladies European Tour player. As an amateur, she won twice on the Swedish Golf Tour and won the European Ladies' Team Championship twice.

Amateur career
Kjellker joined the National Team in 2016 and was part of a golden era of Swedish success in European team championships. With the team, which often included Linn Grant, Frida Kinhult, Amanda Linnér, Maja Stark and Beatrice Wallin, she was runner-up at the 2016 European Girls' Team Championship in Norway, and won the European Ladies' Team Championship back to back in 2018 and 2019.

She won the 2017 Swedish Junior Matchplay Championship and finished third at the 2021 European Ladies Amateur.
 
Kjellker accepted a golf scholarship to San Diego State University, where her brother Emil was already playing with the San Diego State Aztecs men's soccer team. She started playing with the San Diego State Aztecs women's golf team in the fall of 2017. In 2019, Kjellker was runner-up at the Mountain West Championship and she won the event in 2021. In her senior year, she was an All-American and named the Mountain West Conference Women's Golfer of the Year, becoming the third Aztec to win the award.

Playing in a few tournaments on the Swedish Golf Tour, Kjellker won the 2018 Carpe Diem Beds Trophy held at her home course Ljunghusen Golf Club. In 2019, she was runner-up at the Åhus Open at Kristianstad Golf Club, and in 2020 she won her second professional title, the Allerum Open, an event removed from LETAS schedule due to the COVID-19 pandemic.

Professional career
Kjellker turned professional after graduating in 2022, and joined the LET Access Series. She also made three starts on the Ladies European Tour, where she tied for 8th at the Åland 100 Ladies Open in Finland.

Kjellker finished tied 34th at Q-School and joined the 2023 Ladies European Tour with conditional status. She tied for 7th in her first event, the Magical Kenya Ladies Open, alongside fellow rookie Amalie Leth-Nissen.

Amateur wins
2011 Skandia Tour Skåne Södra #2
2012 Götenehus Short Game Masters
2013 Aspero Halland Junior Open, Tallskottet Elit 
2016 Bushnell Ljunghusen Open, PGA Junior Open by Titleist
2017 Swedish Junior Matchplay Championship, Norberg Open
2020 GCAA Amateur Series - Nevada
2021 Mountain West Conference Championship

Sources:

Professional wins (2)

Swedish Golf Tour wins (2)

Team appearances
Amateur
European Girls' Team Championship (representing Sweden): 2016
European Ladies' Team Championship (representing Sweden): 2018 (winners), 2019 (winners), 2021

Source:

References

External links

Swedish female golfers
Ladies European Tour golfers
San Diego State Aztecs women's golfers
Sportspeople from Skåne County
People from Vellinge Municipality
1998 births
Living people